Sebastiaan "Bas" van Bemmelen (born ) is a Dutch male volleyball player. He is part of the Netherlands men's national volleyball team. He competed at the 2013 Men's European Volleyball Championship and 2015 Men's European Volleyball Championship.  On club level he plays for Topvolley Precura Antwerpen in Belgium.

References

External links
 profile at FIVB.org

1989 births
Living people
Dutch men's volleyball players
People from Beuningen
Sportspeople from Gelderland
21st-century Dutch people